Bank BPH (Bank Przemysłowo-Handlowy) was a Polish universal bank.

Until 2008, it was majority owned by UniCredit. In 2008, GE Money Bank took over 89% of shares and on 31 December 2009, Bank BPH merged with GE Money Bank Polska. At its peak, the bank employed over 10,000 people. In October 2014, the bank's owner, General Electric, revealed it was considering selling the firm. In late 2016, Bank BPH was purchased by Alior Bank. Operations of the two banks merged in early 2017.

BPH Group 
 BPH Towarzystwo Funduszy Inwestycyjnych SA
 BPH PBK Zarządzanie Funduszami Sp. z o.o.

References

External links

Bank BPH

Banks of Poland
Companies listed on the Warsaw Stock Exchange